Drinking Again is the 13th studio album by singer Dinah Washington that was released in 1962 by Roulette Records. The album was arranged by Don Costa and contains cover versions of jazz, blues, and pop standards.

Washington died during the next year from a combination of alcohol and diet pills.

Track listing
 "Drinking Again" (Johnny Mercer, Doris Tauber) - 3:31
 "Just Friends" (John Klenner, Sam M. Lewis) - 3:18
 "I'm Gonna Laugh You Right Out of My Life" (Cy Coleman, Joseph A. McCarthy) - 2:53
 "I'll Be Around" (Alec Wilder) - 2:57
 "Lament (Love, I Found You Gone)" (Joe Bailey) - 2:17
 "I Don't Know You Anymore" (Peter Udell, Gary Geld) - 2:49
 "Baby Won't You Please Come Home" (Charles Warfield, Clarence Williams) - 2:08
 "Lover Man (Oh, Where Can You Be?)" (Jimmy Davis, Roger ("Ram") Ramirez, James Sherman) - 3:03
 "The Man That Got Away" (Harold Arlen, Ira Gershwin) - 3:34
 "For All We Know" (J. Fred Coots, Sam M. Lewis) - 3:15
 "Say It Isn't So" (Irving Berlin) - 3:10
 "On the Street of Regret" (Klenner, Pete Wendling) - 2:14

Personnel
Dinah Washington - vocals
Don Costa - arranger

References

Roulette Records albums
Albums arranged by Don Costa
Dinah Washington albums
1962 albums